Jacques Vandier may refer to:

 Jacques Vandier (Egyptologist) (1904–1973), French Egyptologist
 Jacques Vandier (entrepreneur) (1927–2020), French entrepreneur